Ramona Badescu (sometimes written Ramona Bădescu) is a French author of children's literature. Born in Romania, Badescu immigrated to France at the age of 10. She has published 25 books in French since 2002, that have subsequently been translated into English, Chinese, Japanese, Spanish, Swedish, Italian, German, Korean, Norwegian, and Greek.

Badescu's most popular children book series, Pomelo the Garden Elephant, follows the adventures of the titled protagonist, who is a tiny garden elephant about the size of a dandelion. The series, which is illustrated by Benjamin Chaud,  began in 2003 with Pomelo est bien sous son pissenlit ("Pomelo is well under his dandelion") which has not yet been translated in English. There are currently 13 books available in the Pomelo series in French (Albin Michel) and 4 translated into English (Enchanted Lion Books).

Bibliography
 Pomelo Begins to Grow (2011) Enchanted Lion Books 
 Pomelo Explores Color (2012) Enchanted Lion Books 
 Pomelo's Opposites (2013) Enchanted Lion Books 
 Pomelo's Big Adventure (2014) Enchanted Lion Books 
 Big Rabbit's Bad Mood (2009) Chronicle Books

References

 Enchanted Lion Books
 NYT: Pomelo Explores Color
 NYT: Pomelo's Opposites
 NYT: Notable Children's Books of 2011
 NYT: "Picture books about elephants" by Bruce Handy
 Albin Michel: Auteur Ramona Badescu

French children's writers
20th-century French women writers
21st-century French women writers
French women children's writers
20th-century Romanian women writers
21st-century Romanian women writers
Romanian women children's writers
Living people
Year of birth missing (living people)